This is a list of communications-related academic conferences.
Most of these academic conferences are annual or bi-annual events.

Discipline-wide conferences
Association for Education in Journalism and Mass Communication
International Communication Association
National Communication Association

Journalism
Innovation Journalism

Broadcasting
Broadcast Education Association

Public Opinion and Political Communication
World Association for Public Opinion Research 
American Association for Public Opinion Research
American Political Science Association
Midwest Political Science Association
Western Political Science Association

Advertising
American Academy of Advertising

Public Relations
Institute for Public Relations

Marketing

Sociology
American Sociological Association
Midwest Sociological Society

Psychology
American Psychological Association

Internet and New Media
Association of Internet Researchers

Media History and Law
Social Science History Association 
Organization of American Historians
American Journalism Historians Association 
Association for the Study of Law, Culture and the Humanities

Popular culture
Midwest Popular Culture Association

Technology for Communication
CommunicAsia

Academic conferences
Communication-related lists
Lists of conferences